Lucía Medina Sánchez (born 28 August 1969) is an accountant and politician from the Dominican Republic. She was the President of the Chamber of Deputies of the Dominican Republic, and is serving as deputy for the province of San Juan de la Maguana since 2002.

She has been elected deputy for the 2002–2006, 2006–2010, 2010–2016, and 2016–2020 legislative periods; she served as Vice President of the Chamber of Deputies for a decade, from 16 August 2006 to 16 August 2016, and as President of this chamber from 16 August 2016 until 16 August 2017. Lucía Medina is the sister of Danilo Medina, former President of the Dominican Republic.

References 

Living people
1969 births
Dominican Republic people of Spanish descent
Dominican Liberation Party politicians
21st-century Dominican Republic women politicians
21st-century Dominican Republic politicians
People from Bohechío
Presidents of the Chamber of Deputies of the Dominican Republic